is a Japanese video game company. It has created a number of multi-million-selling game franchises, with its most commercially successful being Resident Evil, Monster Hunter, Street Fighter, Mega Man, Devil May Cry, Dead Rising, and Marvel vs. Capcom. Mega Man himself serves as the official mascot of the company. Established in 1979, it has become an international enterprise with subsidiaries in East Asia (Hong Kong), Europe (London, England), and North America (San Francisco, California).

History
Capcom's predecessor, I.R.M. Corporation, was founded on May 30, 1979 by Kenzo Tsujimoto, who was still president of Irem Corporation when he founded I.R.M. He worked concomitantly in both companies until leaving the former in 1983.

The original companies that spawned Capcom's Japan branch were I.R.M. and its subsidiary Japan Capsule Computers Co., Ltd., both of which were devoted to the manufacture and distribution of electronic game machines. The two companies underwent a name change to Sanbi Co., Ltd. in September 1981. On June 11, 1983, Tsujimoto established Capcom Co., Ltd. for the purpose of taking over the internal sales department.

In January 1989, Capcom Co., Ltd. merged with Sanbi Co., Ltd., resulting in the current Japan branch. The name Capcom is a clipped compound of "Capsule Computers", a term coined by the company for the arcade machines it solely manufactured in its early years, designed to set themselves apart from personal computers that were becoming widespread. "Capsule" alludes to how Capcom likened its game software to "a capsule packed to the brim with gaming fun", and to the company's desire to protect its intellectual property with a hard outer shell, preventing illegal copies and inferior imitations.

Capcom's first product was the coin-operated arcade game Little League (1983). It released its first real arcade video game, Vulgus (May 1984). Starting with the arcade hit 1942 (1984), they began designing games with international markets in mind. The successful 1985 arcade games Commando and Ghosts 'n Goblins have been credited as the products "that shot [Capcom] to 8-bit silicon stardom" in the mid-1980s. Starting with Commando (late 1985), Capcom began licensing their arcade games for release on home computers, notably to British software houses Elite Systems and U.S. Gold in the late 1980s.

Beginning with a Nintendo Entertainment System port of 1942 (published in Dec. 1985), the company ventured into the market of home console video games, which would eventually become its main business. The Capcom USA division had a brief stint in the late 1980s as a video game publisher for Commodore 64 and IBM PC DOS computers, although development of these arcade ports was handled by other companies. Capcom went on to create 15 multi-million-selling home video game franchises, with the best-selling being Resident Evil (1996). Their highest-grossing is the fighting game Street Fighter II (1991), driven largely by its success in arcades.

In the late 1980s, Capcom was on the verge of bankruptcy when the development of a strip Mahjong game called Mahjong Gakuen started. It outsold Ghouls 'n Ghosts, the eighth highest-grossing arcade game of 1989 in Japan, and is credited with saving the company from financial crisis.

Capcom has been noted as the last major publisher to be committed to 2D games, though it was not entirely by choice. The company's commitment to the Super Nintendo Entertainment System as its platform of choice caused them to lag behind other leading publishers in developing 3D-capable arcade boards. Also, the 2D animated cartoon-style graphics seen in games such as Darkstalkers: The Night Warriors and X-Men: Children of the Atom proved popular, leading Capcom to adopt them as a signature style and use them in more games.

In 1990, Capcom entered the bowling industry with Bowlingo. It was a coin-operated, electro-mechanical, fully automated mini ten-pin bowling installation. It was smaller than a standard bowling alley, designed to be smaller and cheaper for amusement arcades. Bowlingo drew significant earnings in North America upon release in 1990.

In 1994, Capcom adapted its Street Fighter series of fighting games into a film of the same name. While commercially successful, it was critically panned. A 2002 adaptation of its Resident Evil series faced similar criticism but was also successful in theaters. The company sees films as a way to build sales for its video games.

Capcom partnered with Nyu Media in 2011 to publish and distribute the Japanese independent (dōjin soft) games that Nyu localized into the English language. The company works with the Polish localization company QLOC to port Capcom's games to other platforms; notably, examples are DmC: Devil May Crys PC version and its PlayStation 4 and Xbox One remasters, Dragon's Dogmas PC version, and Dead Risings version on PlayStation 4, Xbox One, and PC.

In 2012, Capcom came under criticism for controversial sales tactics, such as the implementation of disc-locked content, which requires players to pay for additional content that is already available within the game's files, most notably in Street Fighter X Tekken. The company defended the practice. It has also been criticized for other business decisions, such as not releasing certain games outside of Japan (most notably the Sengoku Basara series), abruptly cancelling anticipated projects (most notably Mega Man Legends 3), and shutting down Clover Studio.

On August 27, 2014, Capcom filed a patent infringement lawsuit against Koei Tecmo Games at the Osaka District Court for 980 million yen in damage. Capcom claimed Koei Tecmo infringed a patent it obtained in 2002 regarding a play feature in video games.

On 2 November 2020, the company reported that its servers were affected by ransomware, scrambling its data, and the threat actors, the Ragnar Locker hacker group, had allegedly stolen 1TB of sensitive corporate data and were blackmailing Capcom to pay them to remove the ransomware. By mid-November, the group began putting information from the hack online, which included contact information for up to 350,000 of the company's employees and partners, as well as plans for upcoming games, indicating that Capcom opted to not pay the group. Capcom affirmed that no credit-card or other sensitive financial information was obtained in the hack.

Artist and author Judy A. Juracek filed a lawsuit in June 2021 against Capcom for copyright infringement. In the court filings, she asserted Capcom had used images from her 1996 book Surfaces in their cover art and other assets for Resident Evil 4, Devil May Cry and other games. This was discovered due to the 2020 Capcom data breach, with several files and images matching those that were included within the book's companion CD-ROM. The court filings noted one image file of a metal surface, named ME0009 in Capcom's files, to have the same exact name on the book's CD-ROM. Before a court date could be made, the matter was settled "amicably" in February 2022. It comes on the heels of Capcom being accused by Dutch movie director Richard Raaphorst of copying the monster design of his movie Frankenstein's Army into their game Resident Evil Village.

In February 2022, it was reported by Bloomberg that Saudi Arabia's Public Investment Fund had purchased a 5% stake in Capcom, for an approximate value of $332 USD million.

Corporate structure

Development studios
In its beginning few years, Capcom's Japan branch had three development groups referred to as "Planning Rooms", led by Tokuro Fujiwara, Takashi Nishiyama and Yoshiki Okamoto. Later, games developed internally were created by several numbered "Production Studios", each assigned to different games. Starting in 2002, the development process was reformed to better share technologies and expertise, and the individual studios were gradually restructured into bigger departments responsible for different tasks. While there are self-contained departments for the creation of arcade, pachinko and pachislo, online, and mobile games, the Consumer Games R&D Division is an amalgamation of subsections in charge of game development stages.

Capcom has three internal Consumer Games Development divisions:

 Division 1, headed by Jun Takeuchi, with Resident Evil, Mega Man, Devil May Cry, Dead Rising, and other major franchises (usually targeting global audiences).
 Division 2, headed by Ryozo Tsujimoto (who also heads the Mobile Online Development Division) with Monster Hunter, Ace Attorney, Onimusha, Sengoku Basara, and other franchises with more traditional IP (usually targeting audiences in Asia).
 Division 3, with Street Fighter, Marvel vs. Capcom, Dragon's Dogma, Lost Planet, and other online-focused franchises (games focused on online multiplayer and/or tournaments).

In addition to these teams, Capcom commissions outside development studios to ensure a steady output of titles. However, following poor sales of Dark Void and Bionic Commando, its management has decided to limit outsourcing to sequels and newer versions of installments in existing franchises, reserving the development of original titles for its in-house teams. The production of games, budgets, and platform support are decided on in development approval meetings, attended by the company management and the marketing, sales and quality control departments.

Branches and subsidiaries

Capcom Co., Ltd.'s head office building and R&D building are in Chūō-ku, Osaka. The parent company also has a branch office in the Shinjuku Mitsui Building in Nishi-Shinjuku, Shinjuku, Tokyo; and the Ueno Facility, a branch office in Iga, Mie Prefecture.

The international Capcom Group encompasses 15 subsidiaries in Japan, rest of East Asia, North America, and Europe. Affiliated companies include Koko Capcom Co., Ltd. in South Korea, Street Fighter Film, LLC in the United States, and Dellgamadas Co., Ltd.

Game-related media
In addition to home, online, mobile, arcade, pachinko, and pachislot games, Capcom publishes strategy guides; maintains its own Plaza Capcom arcade centers in Japan; and licenses its franchise and character properties for tie-in products, movies, television series, and stage performances.

Suleputer, an in-house marketing and music label established in cooperation with Sony Music Entertainment Intermedia in 1998, publishes CDs, DVDs, and other media based on Capcom's games. Captivate (renamed from Gamers Day in 2008), an annual private media summit, is traditionally used for new game and business announcements.

Games

Capcom started its Street Fighter franchise in 1987. The series of fighting games are among the most popular in their genre. Having sold almost 50 million copies, it is one of Capcom's flagship franchises. The company also introduced its Mega Man series in 1987, which has sold almost 40 million copies.

The company released the first entry in its Resident Evil survival horror series in 1996, which become its most successful game series, selling more than 130 million copies. After releasing the second entry in the Resident Evil series, Capcom began a Resident Evil game for PlayStation 2. As it was significantly different from the existing series' games, Capcom decided to spin it into its own series, Devil May Cry. The first three entries were exclusively for PlayStation 2; further entries were released for non-Sony consoles. The entire series has sold almost 30 million copies. Capcom began its Monster Hunter series in 2004, which has sold 90 million copies on a variety of consoles.

Although the company often relies on existing franchises, it has also published and developed several titles for the Xbox 360, PlayStation 3, and Wii based on original intellectual property: Lost Planet: Extreme Condition, Dead Rising, Dragon's Dogma, Asura's Wrath, and Zack and Wiki. During this period, Capcom also helped publish several original titles from up-and-coming Western developers, including Remember Me, Dark Void, and Spyborgs, titles other publishers were not willing to gamble on. Other games of note are the titles Ōkami, Ōkamiden, and Ghost Trick: Phantom Detective.

In 2015, the PlayStation 4 version of Ultra Street Fighter IV was pulled from the Capcom Pro Tour due to numerous technical issues and bugs. In 2016, Capcom released Street Fighter V with very limited single player content. At launch, there were stability issues with the game's network that booted players mid-game even when they were not playing in an online mode. Street Fighter V failed to meet its sales target of 2 million in March 2016.

Platinum Titles
Capcom compiles a "Platinum Titles" list, updated quarterly, of its games that have sold over one million copies. It contains over 100 video games. This table shows the top ten titles, by sold copies, as of December 31, 2022.

See also

Articles
Capcom Cup
Capcom Five
DreamHack
Evolution Championship Series

Companies founded by ex-Capcom employees

References

External links
Official website

 
Companies based in Osaka
Companies listed on the Tokyo Stock Exchange
Golden Joystick Award winners
Japanese brands
Japanese companies established in 1979
Pinball manufacturers
Public Investment Fund
Video game companies established in 1979
Video game companies of Japan
Video game development companies
Video game publishers
1993 initial public offerings